Hermosita hakunamatata is a brightly coloured species of sea slug, specifically an aeolid nudibranch. It is a marine gastropod mollusc in the family Facelinidae.

Distribution
The holotype of this species was found at Parque Marino Ballena, Uvita, on the Pacific Ocean coast of Costa Rica. It has been reported from Isla Isabel, Nayarit, Mexico and Panama.

Biology
Hermosita hakunamatata feeds on the hydroid Solanderia.

References

Facelinidae
Gastropods described in 2003